Borderline or Border Line may refer to:

Film and television

Film
Borderline (1930 film), a Swiss film by Kenneth Macpherson
Borderline (1950 film), an American film noir starring Fred MacMurray
Borderline (1980 film), an American film starring Charles Bronson
Border Line, a 1999 television film starring Sherry Stringfield
Borderline (2002 film), an American film starring Gina Gershon
Border Line (film), a 2002 Japanese film by Sang-il Lee
Borderline (2008 film), a Canadian French-language film directed by Lyne Charlebois
Border Line, a 2009 film featuring Johnny Ray

Television
Borderline (TV series), a 2016–2017 British mockumentary television comedy series
The Borderline, a 2014 Hong Kong television series
"Borderline" (Good Girls), a 2018 episode

Literature
Borderline (magazine), a 2001–2003 comics e-zine
Borderline, a 2016 novel by Mishell Baker
Borderline, a 1996 short-story collection by Leanne Frahm
Borderline, a 2010 novel by Allan Stratton
Borderline, a 1996 comic book by Carlos Trillo and Eduardo Risso

Music
Borderline (band), an early-1970s American country rock band
Borderline Records

Albums
Borderline (Brooks & Dunn album), 1996
Borderline (Conway Twitty album) or the title song, 1987
Borderline (Ry Cooder album) or the title song, 1980
Borderline (EP), by Tove Styrke, or the title song, 2014

Songs
"Borderline" (Brandy song), 2020
"Borderline" (Madonna song), 1984
"Borderline" (Michael Gray song), 2006
"Borderline" (The Shooters song), 1988
"Borderline" (Tove Styrke song), 2014
"Borderline" (Sunmi song), 2021
"Borderline" (Tame Impala song), 2019
"Borderline", by Ariana Grande from Sweetener, 2018
"Borderline", by Camper Van Beethoven from Key Lime Pie, 1989
"Borderline", by Cheap Trick from Next Position Please, 1983
"Borderline", by Chris de Burghfrom The Getaway, 1982
"Borderline", by Exo-SC from What a Life, 2019
"Borderline", by Jeff Lynne from Armchair Theatre, 2013 remaster
"Borderline", by Joni Mitchell from Turbulent Indigo, 1994
"Border Line", by King Krule from 6 Feet Beneath the Moon, 2013
"Borderline", by Les Emmerson, 1977
"Borderline", by Man Overboard from Heavy Love, 2015
"Borderline", by Spirit from Tent of Miracles, 1990
"Borderline", by Sufjan Stevens, B-side of "The Dress Looks Nice on You", 2004
"Borderline", by Thin Lizzy from Johnny the Fox, 1976
"Borderline (An Ode to Self Care)", by Solange from A Seat at the Table, 2016

Places and structures
Border Line (Switzerland), a series of defensive fortifications constructed in the 1930s
Borderline Speedway, a dirt-track racing venue in South Australia
Borderline Bar and Grill, site of the 2018 Thousand Oaks shooting, California, US

Other uses
Borderline (video game), a 1981 arcade game by Sega
Borderline personality disorder, a psychiatric condition
Borderline Theatre Company, a Scottish touring company

See also

 Border (disambiguation)
Borderliner (Grenseland), a 2017 Norwegian crime drama television series
Borderliners (De måske egnede), a 1993 novel by Peter Høeg
 Borderlines Film Festival, a British rural film festival
The Caretakers, a 1963 film released in the UK as Borderlines
 On the Border (disambiguation)